Ted may refer to:

Names 
A shortened form of the following:
 Edward
 Thaddeus
 Theodore (given name)

Art, entertainment, and media

Fictional characters 
 Ted Bartelo, a character in the American sitcom television series Kate & Allie
 Ted, the Generic Guy, in comic strip Dilbert
 Ted and Ralph sketches from the UK TV series The Fast Show
 Theodore “Ted“ Logan, a character in the Bill & Ted film series
 Ted Buckland, from the U.S. TV series Scrubs
 Father Ted Crilly, from the Irish TV sitcom Father Ted
 Ted Crisp, in U.S. TV series Better Off Ted
 Ted Denslow, a character in 1998 the American sports comedy movie BASEketball
 Ted Franklin, in TV sitcom iCarly
 Ted Glen, a character in the Postman Pat series
 Ted Henderson, a character in the film and TV series Bob & Carol & Ted & Alice
 Ted Kord, the second Blue Beetle from DC Comics
 Ted Lawson, in sitcom Small Wonder (TV series)
 Ted Lasso, title character from the eponymous television series
 Ted Mosby, from the U.S. TV series How I Met Your Mother
 Ted Ramsey, a character in the American television sitcom Diff'rent Strokes
 Theodore Schmidt, from the North American TV series Queer as Folk
 Theodore Sprague, from the U.S. TV series Heroes
 Ted Shackleford, in the movie and TV series Curious George
 Ted Stroehmann, a character played by Ben Stiller in the 1998 movie There's Something About Mary
 Ted Talbot, Sr., in the TV series Rectify
 Theodore Wong, a character from the American web series Video Game High School

Films
 Ted (film), a 2012 American comedy film directed by Seth MacFarlane and starring MacFarlane alongside Mark Wahlberg and Mila Kunis
Ted 2, the 2015 sequel to the 2012 film, directed by MacFarlane and starring MacFarlane, Wahlberg and Amanda Seyfried

Music
 Ted (album), by Swede Ted Gärdestad
 "Ted", from the 1980 album Virgin Ground by Redgum
 "Ted", from the 2006 album Body Riddle by electronic

Television
 "Ted" (Buffy the Vampire Slayer episode)

People

Media 
 Ted Allen (born 1965), American writer
 Ted Childs (born 1934), British television producer, screenwriter and director
 Ted Danson (born 1947), American actor
 Ted Failon (born 1962), Filipino broadcast journalist
 Ted Healy (1896–1937), American comedian and actor
 Ted Hughes (1930-1998), English Poet Laureate
 Ted Jackson (born 1955), photographer
 Ted Key (1912–2008), American cartoonist and writer
 Ted King (actor) (born 1965), American actor
 Ted Knight (1923–1986), American actor
 Ted Koppel (born 1940), American broadcast journalist
 Ted Mack (radio-TV host) (1904-1976), US
 Ted Moore (1914–1987), British cinematographer
 Ted Turner (born 1938), American businessman

Music 
 Ted Gärdestad (1956–1997), Swedish singer-songwriter
 Ted Heath (bandleader) (1902–1969), English bandleader
 Ted Herold (1942–2021), German singer 
 Ted Key (musician) (born 1960), English bass guitarist
 Ted Nugent (born 1948), American guitarist
 Ted Sablay (born 1976), guitarist
 Bruce Slesinger (known simply as Ted), Dead Kennedys drummer

Politics 
 Ted Cruz (born 1970), U.S. Senator
 Sir Edward Heath (known as Ted Heath) (1916–2005), British Prime Minister 1970–1974
 Ted Kennedy (1932–2009), U.S. Senator
 Ted Lieu (born 1969), U.S. Representative
 Ted Olson (born 1940), former U.S. Solicitor General  
 Theodore 'Teddy' Roosevelt (1858–1919), 26th US President 1901–1909
 Ted Sorensen (1928–2010), speechwriter
 Ted Stevens (1923–2010), U.S. Senator
 Ted Strickland (born 1941), U.S. politician

Sports 
 Ted Arcidi (born 1958/1959), American former professional wrestler, actor, and powerlifter 
 Ted Bachman (born 1952), American football player
 Ted Brithen (born 1990), Swedish ice hockey player
 Ted Dailey (1908–1992), American football player
 Ted Dexter (1935–2021), English cricketer
 Ted DiBiase (born 1954), American retired professional wrestler
 Ted DiBiase Jr. (born 1982), American businessman, actor, and former professional wrestler
 Ted Gerela (1944–2020), Canadian football player
 Ted Greene (American football) (1932–1982), American football player
 Ted Kennedy (ice hockey) (1925–2009), Canadian ice hockey player
 Ted King (cyclist) (born 1983), American cyclist
 Ted "Kid" Lewis (Gershon Mendeloff; 1893–1970), English  boxer
 Ted Lindsay (1925–2019), Canadian ice hockey player
 Ted Milian (born 1954), Canadian football player
 Ted Nolan (born 1958), Canadian ice hockey coach and executive
 Ted Simmons (born 1949), American baseball player 
 Ted Vincent (born 1956), American football player
 Ted Whitten (1933–1995), Australian football player
 Ted Williams (1918–2002), American baseball player

Other 
 Ted de Boer (born 1943), Dutch law scholar
 Ted Bundy (1946–1989), American 1970s serial killer
 Ted Kaczynski ("The Unabomber"; born 1942), US terrorist
 Ted Maher (born 1958), American Green Beret turned registered nurse
 Ted Jeffrey Otsuki, American fugitive

Other uses 
 Ted (airline),  United Airlines brand
 Ted (word processor)
 Ted, a crash test dummy on the show MythBusters
 Ted, a 2009 novel by Tony DiTerlizzi

See also 
 TED (disambiguation)
 
 Tedd (given name)
 Teddy (disambiguation)
 Teddy Boy, a style of dress
 Teds (disambiguation)

English masculine given names